Eternal security, also known as "once saved, always saved", is the belief that from the moment anyone becomes a Christian, they will be saved from hell, and will not lose salvation. Once a person is truly "born of God" or "regenerated" by the indwelling of the Holy Spirit, nothing in heaven or earth "shall be able to separate (them) from the love of God" (Romans 8:39) and thus nothing can reverse the condition of having become a Christian.

Eternal security is prominent among Reformed Christians (Continental Reformed, Congregationalists, Presbyterians, Reformed Anglicans, and Reformed Baptists) due to the doctrine of Perseverance of the saints, but is also affirmed by the Plymouth Brethren, as well as in Free Grace Theology, which is held by many independent fundamental Baptists (though the Reformed, Plymouth Brethren and Free Grace traditions teach different versions of eternal security). In contrast, conditional security are taught in Catholicism, Lutheranism, Orthodoxy, Anabaptism, Pentecostalism and Methodism.

History 

One of the last works made by Augustine addresses the Gift of Perseverance. In the work Augustine notes that persons cannot know whether or not they have received that gift from God. Since Augustine accepted the doctrine that the Holy Spirit is received at water baptism producing regeneration (salvation), he tried to explain why some regenerated babies continued in the faith while other baptized infants would fall away from the faith and even live immoral lives in debauchery. Both groups possessed the Holy Spirit, so how can one account for the difference? Augustine concluded that God must give a second gift of grace called perseverance. The gift of perseverance is only given to some baptized infants.

Augustine did not believe that his doctrine of perseverance was a new invention, thus Augustine also claimed that Cyprian taught a similar doctrine concerning perseverance. Augustine argued from quotes of Cyprian's treatise on the Lord's prayer that he also saw perseverance as a gift of God. 

Jovinian (died: 405 AD) was an early church theologian often seen as a proto-Reformer in the 4th century, he believed that a person who was once regenerate could never be subverted by the devil. Thus his teaching has similarities to what Augustine and John Calvin taught, as he limits the impossibility of relapse to the truly regenerate.

Gottschalk (808 – 868) believed that all of the elect are eternally secure and cannot fall from salvation.

Augustine mentioned that some people in his day believed that even if a Christian did no good works he would still be saved but have temporary punishments.

Ambrosiaster stated: ”But those who appear to believe yet do not persevere in the faith are not chosen by God, because whoever God chooses will persevere. ”

Views

Theology affirming the doctrine of eternal security
The traditional Calvinist doctrine teaches that a person is secure in salvation because he or she was predestined by God and therefore guaranteed to persevere, whereas in the Free Grace or non-traditional Calvinist views, a person is secure because at some point in time he or she has believed the Gospel message (Dave Hunt, What Love is This, p. 481).

Reformed Christianity

In Reformed Christianity, eternal security is a logical consequence of the doctrine of perseverance of the saints, according to which true Christians will persevere in good works and faith. Because faith is God's perfect gift it will inevitably produce perseverance in faith and good works. Thus condemnation to hell because of sin, unbelief, or apostasy is not possible for true Christians. Reformed theology holds that one's continued belief in Christ and good works are evidence of one's saving faith and that if one does not bear this fruit, he/she was never truly regenerated to begin with.

Plymouth Brethren
The Plymouth Brethren affirm eternal security as long as a Christian believer continues to have faith in Jesus. In the Plymouth Brethren view "a true believer in Christ will continue in his faith." Those who do not bear good works, as with Judas, never experienced the New Birth.

Free grace theology
Free grace theology says that anyone who believes in Jesus Christ will go to heaven regardless of any future actions—including future sin, unbelief, or apostasy—though Christians who sin or abandon the faith will face God's discipline.

Free Grace doctrine views the person's character and life after receiving the gift of salvation as independent from the gift itself, or in other words, it asserts that justification (that is, being declared righteous before God on account of Christ) does not necessarily result in sanctification (that is, a progressively more righteous life). Charles Stanley, pastor of Atlanta's megachurch First Baptist and a television evangelist, has written that the doctrine of eternal security of the believer persuaded him years ago to leave his familial Pentecostalism and become a Southern Baptist. He sums up his deep conviction that salvation is by faith alone in Christ alone when he claims, "Even if a believer for all practical purposes becomes an unbeliever, his salvation is not in jeopardy… believers who lose or abandon their faith will retain their salvation." For example, Stanley writes:

In a chapter entitled "For Those Who Stop Believing", he says, "The Bible clearly teaches that God's love for His people is of such magnitude that even those who walk away from the faith have not the slightest chance of slipping from His hand (p. 74)." A little later, Stanley also writes: "You and I are not saved because we have an  enduring faith. We are saved because at a moment in time we expressed faith in  our enduring Lord" (p. 80).

The doctrine sees the work of salvation as wholly monergistic, which is to say that God alone performs it and man has no part in the process beyond receiving it, and therefore, proponents argue that man cannot undo what they believe God has done. By comparison, in traditional Calvinism, people, who are otherwise unable to follow God, are enabled by regeneration to cooperate with him, and so the Reformed tradition sees itself as mediating between the total monergism of the non-traditional Calvinist view and the synergism of the Wesleyan, Arminian, and Roman Catholic views in which even unregenerate man can choose to cooperate with God in salvation.

Molinism 
One of the points of Molinism is "eternal life", Molinists believe that the only basis for assurance is the work of Christ and that saving faith always perseveres to the end, however persevarance is a promise instead of a requirement.

Theology rejecting the doctrine of Eternal Security
 
Catholic, Methodist, Anabaptist, Oriental Orthodox and Eastern Orthodox theology hold to synergism with respect to salvation and view the doctrine of eternal security as heretical, instead teaching that one's one's salvation is conditional on one's continued faith, good works, sanctification, and avoidance of sin.

Catholicism
In Catholicism, Christians do not have eternal security because they can commit a mortal sin. The Church teach that Christians are subject to the cleansing torment of purgatory before entrance into heaven.

Orthodoxy
The Eastern Orthodox Churches and the Oriental Orthodox Churches teach "the conditional security of the believer".

Lutheranism
The Lutheran Churches teach that true Christian believers can fall away from the faith into apostasy.

Anabaptism
Anabaptists, such as Conservative Mennonites, teach that "Each member of the church has free will and can separate themselves from the body of Christ and live a sinful life, even if they once were bound to Christ."

Classical Arminianism and Wesleyan Arminianism

The Arminian view, inclusive of the Classical Arminian position and Wesleyan-Arminian (Methodist) position, opposes any concept of eternal security, holding that a true Christian can fall from grace and be condemned to hell.

See also 
 
Backsliding
Conditional preservation of the saints
Five Crowns
Perseverance of the saints

References 

Christian terminology
Evangelical theology
Salvation in Protestantism